St Marys, an electoral district of the Legislative Assembly in the Australian state of New South Wales had two incarnations, from 1981 to 1988 and from 1991 to 1999.


Election results

Elections in the 1990s

1995

1991

1988 - 1991
District abolished

Elections in the 1980s

1984

1981

References

New South Wales state electoral results by district